Lynne Frederick (25 July 1954 – 27 April 1994) was an English actress, film producer, and fashion model. In a career spanning ten years, she made over thirty appearances in film and television productions. Known for her classic English rose beauty, she often played the girl next door and was famous for her performances in a range of genres, from contemporary science fiction to slasher horror, romantic dramas, classic westerns, and occasional comedies; although her greater successes were in period films and costume dramas.

In 1980, after the death of her husband, Peter Sellers, she came to national attention over the nature of his controversial will, in which she was listed as the primary beneficiary. She was publicly criticised, ridiculed and perceived as a gold digger by the press and public. Her career and reputation never recovered from the backlash and she was subsequently blacklisted by Hollywood. She lived out the remainder of her years in California, and kept a low profile until her death in 1994.

In the decades since her death, Frederick's legacy has steadily established a posthumous cult following for her collection of work in motion pictures. Some of her better known performances include her roles in films such as Nicholas and Alexandra (1971), The Amazing Mr. Blunden (1972), Henry VIII and His Six Wives (1972), and Voyage of the Damned (1976). Other films of hers such as Vampire Circus (1971), Phase IV (1974), Four of the Apocalypse (1975), A Long Return (Largo retorno) (1975), and Schizo (1976) have all become underground hits or established a status as a cult film in their respective genres, contributing to the renewed interest in her life and career.

She was the first recipient of the award for Best New Coming Actress from the Evening Standard British Film Awards in 1973, for her performances in Henry VIII and His Six Wives (1972) and The Amazing Mr. Blunden (1972). She is one of only eight actresses, and the youngest, to hold this title.

Early life
Frederick was born in Hillingdon, Middlesex, to Andrew Frederick (1914–1983) and Iris C. Frederick (née Sullivan, 1928–2006). While she was very young, her father abandoned the family, and she was brought up by her mother and maternal grandmother, Cecilia. Lynne never knew or met her father, and had no personal relationships or connections with his side of the family. Although her mother was employed as a casting director for Thames Television, they often lived a frugal lifestyle. In her work, Iris gained a reputation for being a stern and imposing individual.

Frederick was brought up in Market Harborough in Leicestershire. She occasionally faced social stigma due to her parents' divorce. She attended Notting Hill and Ealing High School in London. Her original career choice was to become a schoolteacher of physics and mathematics.

Career

1969–1974: early roles 
Frederick was discovered at the age of 15 by Hungarian-American actor and film director Cornel Wilde, who was a friend and colleague of her mother. Wilde had been looking for a young, unknown actress to star in his film adaptation of the best selling post-apocalyptic science fiction novel The Death of Grass. Wilde first saw her when she came to work with her mother to pose for some test shots and was immediately smitten by her beauty, charisma, and bubbly personality. Despite her having no previous experience in theatre, films, or commercials, Wilde offered her the role without an audition.

When No Blade of Grass (1970) was released, the film received mixed reviews from critics. Notwithstanding the lukewarm reception of the film, Frederick became an overnight sensation, and her career quickly took off. Represented by the talent agency, Hazel Malone Management, Frederick became a teen idol among the British public in the early 1970s, and was seen as the next Hayley Mills and Olivia Hussey. She was regularly featured in newspaper articles and fashion magazines as a model and cover girl. For a spread in the September 1971 edition of British Vogue, she was photographed by Patrick Lichfield. In addition, she appeared in several television commercials for products that included Camay soap. Frederick then signed a cosmetics contract with Mennen, and became a spokesmodel for Protein 21 shampoo, starring in nationwide print and television advertising campaigns. A British national newspaper also chose her as its "Face of 1971", and she was hailed as one of Britain's most promising newcomers.

In 1971, she appeared in the biographical film Nicholas and Alexandra (1971), in which she played the Grand Duchess Tatiana Nikolaevna of Russia, second eldest daughter of Tsar Nicholas II. For the film's press tour, she toured Europe with her three co-stars Ania Marson, Candace Glendenning, and Fiona Fullerton. That same year, she auditioned for the role of Alice in Alice's Adventures in Wonderland (1972), but lost the role to her friend Fiona Fullerton. She was also first runner-up for the role of Saint Clare of Assisi in the Franco Zeffirelli production of Brother Sun, Sister Moon (1972), which ultimately went to Judi Bowker.

Her best-known appearance was in 1972 when she played Catherine Howard, in Henry VIII and His Six Wives. Her next role was in the 1972 family film The Amazing Mr. Blunden; in 1973, she won the Evening Standard British Film Award for Best New Actress. She continued to work in film and television projects throughout 1973 and 1974, where she was often cast in the archetypal roles of the girl next door, an ingénue, or a princess. Some of the shows in which she appeared were Wessex Tales, Follyfoot, The Generation Game, and an adaptation of The Canterville Ghost where she first met David Niven, who became a lifelong friend.
 
Frederick's most prominent television role came in 1974 when she appeared in three episodes of the critically-acclaimed and Emmy-winning series The Pallisers. The series featured a huge cast of prominent and rising British actors, including Anthony Andrews, of whom she played the love interest.

1975–1977: adult stardom
Frederick landed a role in the Spanish romance film A Long Return (Largo retorno, 1975), where she also made her debut and only appearance singing on a film's soundtrack. She also appeared alongside Fabio Testi in Four of the Apocalypse as well as in the adventure film Cormack of the Mounties. She returned to playing a teen-aged character in the Spanish film El Vicio Y La Virtud (1975).

Frederick began 1976 with an appearance in a then controversial episode of the BBC series Play for Today, titled "The Other Woman", in which she played a sexually enigmatic girl who falls for a lesbian artist played by Jane Lapotaire. Later the same year, she delivered a critically-acclaimed performance in the Oscar-nominated film, Voyage of the Damned (1976). She followed that with a leading role in a Pete Walker slasher horror film, Schizo (1976), a movie that became an underground hit in the horror film genre.

Along with Frederick's rising mainstream success as an actress, her modelling career was also taking off. Shifting her style and image to that of a more sophisticated glamour girl, Frederick emerged as a movie sex symbol of the late 1970s. Her profile expanded to Japan, and she became a frequent face in the Japanese entertainment magazine, Screen. She was featured as a celebrity centerfold pin-up, and made the cover three times in the space of eighteen months. Frederick was also listed in several press and editorial publications as one of photographer Terry Fincher's muses.

By this point in her career, Frederick was earning over £4,000  (£ today) per week for her film work alone. She was also being represented by A-list Hollywood agent, Dennis Selinger, who represented internationally successful British actors such as Vanessa Redgrave, Michael Caine, and Sean Connery. Selinger was gradually preparing Frederick for worldwide crossover stardom in more prolific and mainstream film and television productions, as he had previously done with Susan George. In addition, Frederick had now reached the point where she no longer had to audition for roles, and was being sent stacks of scripts and lucrative film offers.

1978–1980: career decline and blacklisting
Following her marriage to Peter Sellers in 1977, Frederick's career stalled for over a year as Sellers forced her to turn down all the acting offers she was receiving, in order to tend him through poor health. This included supporting and looking after him on the sets of his films. She attempted to make a career comeback in 1978, but the year-long absence had cost Frederick her burgeoning stardom.

Frederick campaigned and auditioned for several films. The role that she most desired, and spent a great deal of time lobbying for, was the leading role of Meggie Cleary in The Thorn Birds. Despite her lengthy and accomplished acting résumé, the producers decided they wanted a much bigger catch, Rachel Ward. Other roles she campaigned for included Cosette in the 1978 television adaptation of Les Misérables (1978), and Anne Sullivan in the television remake of The Miracle Worker (1979), neither of which she received. She made her final onscreen appearance with her husband, Sellers, in the 1979 remake of The Prisoner of Zenda, which was a box-office and critical flop. Her final credit was as an executive producer on Sellers's last film The Fiendish Plot of Dr. Fu Manchu (1980).

Following Sellers's death, his controversial will, the ongoing feuds with her stepchildren, and her short marriage to David Frost, Frederick became a figure of hate and ridicule in the press and other media. The Daily Mirror even featured her in a smear campaign list of disgraced public figures of 1980. Labelled as a “gold digger” and "professional wife", she was consequently shunned and blacklisted from the film industry. By 1982, at age 28, she was considered unemployable and gradually dropped out of the public eye.

Personal life

Marriages
Frederick's first marriage, at 22, was to Peter Sellers. They met at a Dennis Selinger dinner party in 1976 after Frederick had finished making Schizo (1976). Sellers initially proposed to her two days after their first meeting, but she turned him down. They courted for a year before he proposed to her again. They eloped to Paris on 18 February 1977.

Contrary to popular belief, their marriage started well, and they were a popular red carpet couple among the British public. Writer Stephen Bach said of their relationship, “I noticed as he [Peter Sellers] rose, that not once in the long talkative afternoon had he let go of Lynne's hand, nor had she moved away. She transfused him simultaneously with calm and energy, and the hand he clung to was less a hand than a lifeline”. He also added that he believed that Lynne had a unique ability to calm Sellers' manic moods; “the atmosphere was uneasy only until Lynne Frederick came into the room, exuding an aura of calm that somehow enveloped us all like an Alpine fragrance. She was only in her mid-twenties, but instantly observable as the mature center around which the household revolved, an emotional anchor that looked like a daffodil.” David Niven, who was a friend to both Sellers and Frederick, had credited Peter's happiness to Lynne being a devoted and loving wife.

Their marriage declined as Sellers's health deteriorated. He forced Frederick to forfeit her growing and lucrative acting career to care for him. Sellers's biographer, Ed Sikov, claimed that Frederick was offered a lucrative five-month job in Moscow where she was to lead a big budgeted television miniseries, but Sellers insisted she should turn it down so that he would not be left alone.

The tension between them increased after the box-office and critical failure of The Prisoner of Zenda (1979), followed by negative tabloid reports of rumours of drug use, infidelity, domestic abuse, and other alleged conflicts. Despite their struggles, Frederick stood by Sellers and cared for him as his health continued to decline and he became more temperamental. Although they separated a number of times, they always came back together.

Sellers was reportedly in the process of excluding her from his will a week before he died of a heart attack on 24 July 1980, the day before her 26th birthday. The planned changes to the will not having been finalised, she inherited almost his entire estate, worth an estimated £4.5 million (£ million today), and his children received £800 each (£ today). Despite appeals from a number of Sellers's friends to make a fair settlement to the children, Frederick allegedly refused to give her stepchildren anything due to their rocky relationship with her and Peter. After Sellers's death, her stepson, Michael Sellers, published an exposé memoir concerning his relationship with his father, P.S. I Love You: An Intimate Portrait of Peter Sellers. In the book, he accused Frederick of being a deceitful, cunning and narcissistic fraud who only married his father for his money. He also alleged that Frederick had cheated his sisters and him out of their inheritance by intentionally manipulating their father to alter the will in her favour. This led to the press vilifying and labeling her as a "gold digger".

She briefly married David Frost (on 25 January 1981), and her supposed eagerness to remarry so quickly after Sellers's death caused a loss of reputation in the public eye, and was one of the major factors in her blacklisting. Prior to their marriage, Frederick had known Frost for several years and they were occasional lovers in between relationships. Frederick divorced Frost after 17 months. During the course of their marriage, she suffered a miscarriage in March 1982.

In December 1982, she married U.S. cardiologist Barry Unger with whom she had her only child, Cassie Cecilia Unger (born 1983). They divorced in 1991.

Later life
After being blacklisted and losing her acting career, Frederick lived a very narrow, private, and reclusive lifestyle. When she divorced Frost, she faced public embarrassment when it was reported that she became intoxicated at a formal restaurant and had to be escorted out. Following this incident, she fled from England to California and never returned to her homeland again. In later years she was known for being fiercely private. Subsequently, she refused to give interviews and distanced herself from the celebrity lifestyle.

After her divorce from her third husband, Barry Unger, Frederick lived in a Los Angeles mansion that was previously owned by Gary Cooper. As the years went by, she struggled with alcoholism, seizures, and clinical depression. There were also rumors of nervous breakdowns and suicide attempts. Despite participating in numerous recovery treatments at hospitals and clinics, she was unable to rebuild her health. Weary after her years of public scorn and deteriorating conditions, she cloistered herself in her home for days at a time. This led to her mother Iris moving from England to California to live with Frederick to help care for her and her daughter, Cassie.

Frederick was the sole manager of Sellers's estate. She took such pride in being Sellers's wife that she legally changed her last name to Sellers. It has been reported that when she took part in group therapy sessions, she introduced herself as "Lynne Sellers, the wife of Peter Sellers".

Relationships
Frederick, who never met her biological father, regarded actor David Niven as her substitute father. They first met while filming the television film adaptation of The Canterville Ghost (1974). They remained close friends over the years until Niven's death in 1983, which occurred just eight weeks after the birth of her daughter.

As a child, Lynne was very close to her mother, Iris, and grandmother, Cecilia. Her relationship with her mother suffered major damage after she married Peter Sellers in 1977. Five days after the wedding, Iris spoke out against the marriage in an interview with the Daily Mirror:
"Time will tell, but I think Lynne has made a terrible mistake. I hope it will work for her sake. He [Peter Sellers] is a brilliant man, but not the kind of son in law I would have chosen. I wasn't invited to the ceremony, but that isn't surprising. When I heard it was taking place, I said: 'The sooner it happens, the sooner it will be over'. Somehow, in view of Sellers's previous record with the ladies who have gone before, I think this marriage may not last too long."

Feeling hurt and betrayed by this interview, Lynne did not see or speak to her mother again for the duration of her marriage to Sellers. When asked about cutting ties with her daughter, Iris said: "I have my own life to live. Of course I still love her. I’ve cried for her and I miss her a great deal. Lynne is right when she says we were terribly close and it hurts when I see her using the press to make me look the guilty party in all this."

During the period when Iris was not in communication with Lynne, she continued to publicly blast her daughter’s marriage in the press.
"My own marriage ended unhappily when Lynne was two. I tried to compensate for her having no father by devoting all the time I wasn't working to her. Perhaps if I had married again she wouldn't gone on choosing men twice her age as boyfriends - looking for a father figure I suppose. She met Peter Sellers on the rebound from David Frost. I thought 'here we go again' but I didn't want to be the one to put it down without giving it a chance. I know I said things later about marital track record not being very good, but at the time I went along with it wondering how long it would be before I was having to give him the 'Lynne regrets' speech. Now I ask you! What mother can be expected to approve of the marriage of her daughter to such a man? My heart bled for her. To me their marriage is doomed right from the start. I hope and pray they'll prove me wrong. God knows I want Lynne to be happy. But this time I must let her sort it out for herself. She must understand that I am staying clear for her sake even though it hurts me to do so."

After Sellers's death in 1980, Frederick reconciled with her mother. Despite its rekindling, their relationship was never the same again.

In 1972, while in her late teens, Frederick became involved with Curzon House Club casino owner, Julian Posner, who like Sellers was thirty years her senior. They had an on-and-off relationship for about three years until 1975, while Frederick's acting career continued to blossom. During their off times, Frederick would often discreetly engage in affairs with her friend and future husband, David Frost.

Frederick's relationship with her former stepchildren (Michael Sellers, Sarah Sellers, and Victoria Sellers) was, like Peter's relationship with them, distant and often strained. When Lynne began her relationship with Peter, she made efforts to establish a friendly connection with them. Sarah recalled of Lynne, "she seemed quite nice to begin with. I actually told dad that I thought she was a bit stupid. But she came across as very bubbly, friendly, warm and interested. But once they got married things definitely changed". Michael Sellers wrote of Frederick in his exposé memoir, "my first impression of Lynne didn't do much to alter my views. She was not exactly my idea of sweetness and light. It didn't concern me that she lacked the good looks of dad's past wives and girlfriends, but those innocent eyes, certainly her strongest feature, didn't deceive me". Michael Sellers also bluntly acknowledged his intentional hostility and lack of respect towards Lynne when they first met: "I'm afraid we weren't very kind in our judgement of Lynne. Sarah thought she wasn't too bright. But our views didn't really count for much. Because whatever our opinions, they would be of purely academic interest". Months after Frederick's death in 1994, Victoria remarked "I feel now that she's in hell - I don't know but that makes me feel better."

When she made the film Nicholas and Alexandra (1971), the director, Franklin J. Schaffner, arranged for Lynne and her co-stars (Michael Jayston, Janet Suzman, Roderick Noble, Ania Marson, Candace Glendenning, and Fiona Fullerton) to live together as a family during the nine-month production period, so as to add more authenticity to their performances. During this time, she developed a close friendship with her co-star Fiona Fullerton (who played her younger sister in the film). They remained good friends for several years.

One of Frederick's closest friends was Mauritian actress, Françoise Pascal. The two first met when they co-starred on a 1972 episode of the television anthology series, BBC Play of the Month, and quickly became "firm friends". Pascal recalled that they remained friends for several years before regretfully losing touch after Frederick married Sellers in 1977. In April 2020, a few weeks before the 26th anniversary of Frederick's death, Pascal tweeted a photo of herself and Frederick, with the caption "I think of her very often! Always had that fresh baby face! RIP Lynne! Xxx".

In 2018, Judy Matheson revealed that she had worked with Frederick in the early 1970s. They were slated to appear in a film together that was to be shot in the Netherlands, with John Hamil, Robert Coleby, and Nina Francis. Because Frederick was young and a relative newcomer to filmmaking at the time, Matheson (who was a few years older and had industry experience) was asked to be Lynne's chaperone for the trip (as Lynne's mother was unavailable). They spent about three weeks lodged together in a hotel room before production on the film was prematurely closed due to financial withdrawals. Matheson stated that she enjoyed Frederick's company, and that they managed to have fun together despite the production difficulties. After returning to Great Britain, they corresponded for a while before gradually losing touch with each other.

During production of Four of the Apocalypse (1975), she was rumoured to have had a brief romance with her co-star Fabio Testi (who was having trouble in his relationship with actress Ursula Andress at the time), which was also during a time when Frederick was having trouble in her own relationship with Julian Posner. Naturally, this helped Testi and Frederick with their chemistry in the movie, and they were paired again for the film Cormack of the Mounties (1975). There has been much speculation about such a romance between Testi and Frederick, but it has not been confirmed.

In her 2014 memoir I Said Yes to Everything, Lee Grant claimed that during production of the film Voyage of the Damned (1976) Frederick, then aged 21, engaged in an affair with Sam Wanamaker, who was 35 years Frederick's senior and married to Charlotte Holland at the time. Grant also stated that she witnessed all the men on set, including the film's director Stuart Rosenberg, make salacious passes at Frederick, all of which she rejected.

Julie Andrews stated in her 2019 autobiography Home Work: A Memoir of My Hollywood Years that she suspected her husband Blake Edwards was having an affair with Lynne (who was married to Sellers at the time) during production of Revenge of the Pink Panther (1978). When Andrews confronted Blake about the "flirtations" between him and Frederick, Julie asked him point-blank which he preferred: staying married or continuing this flirtation. After this confrontation, Blake apparently ceased any kind of flirtation with Frederick. She later had a falling-out with Edwards and Andrews after successfully suing them for their involvement with the film Trail of the Pink Panther (1982), claiming that it insulted Sellers's memory. She never spoke to them again.

Political views and beliefs
In a 1975 interview with Men Only, Frederick stated that she "partially agreed" with Women's Lib. Adding "I agree with the fact that women should have equal rights", but adding that she also believed in some old fashioned gender roles. "I agree that there are certain things that men are designed to do; just as there are things women are designed to do."

She was a supporter of Margaret Thatcher, calling her a "very capable woman", and saying that "I think women are just as capable of ruling people and looking after our affairs as men are. Sometimes possibly better because women have a level of sensibility and sensitivity as well, which possibly men don't sometimes."

Although not gay herself, Frederick was known for being a blunt and outspoken advocate for same sex relationships and LGBT rights during a time when it was considered highly taboo. Following her appearance on a controversial episode of the television series Play for Today, where she played a sexually fluid character and shared an onscreen kiss with her female co-star, Jane Lapotaire, she said "with homosexuality and lesbianism, I just don't think you can put a ban on it. I don't think you can say it's wrong. I think people should live how they want to live. I don't think it should be illegal."

Frederick grew up as a Methodist. In a 1975 interview, she expressed some agnostic views when she was asked about a progressive Catholic priest's response to the pope's declaring premarital sex a sin. "I really agree with the other priests that it should have never been issued. I think that does put the Church back; I really do. I can say it because I'm not particularly religious. But I think people who are religious, I hope they would feel that it's not a step forward. I think premarital sex is a good idea. I think the worst thing that could possibly happen is to not have sex before you get married, then get married and find out it's dreadful." After Peter Sellers died, she went to visit spiritualist and psychic medium, Doris Collins. When asked if she believed in life after death, she replied “I’ve always believed that death was not the end.” Frederick later suggested in an interview that she still retained her Methodist faith: “I never touch hard liquor. I suppose wine is ok for a good Methodist like me.”

Philanthropy
Following the death of her first husband Peter Sellers, she became involved in donating to various heart charities.

In November 1980, she bought and donated an echocardiograph (valued at £12,400) to the Middlesex Hospital in London where Sellers died of a heart attack. Frederick stated “I wanted to try and reciprocate in some way to the enormous love and care which staff here showed my husband.”

After her own death in 1994, she left individual sums of $250,000 to the British Heart Foundation and the Middlesex Hospital in London as tribute to Sellers (who died of a heart attack). As a sign of gratitude, the Middlesex Hospital hung a plaque thanking both Sellers and Frederick for their generous contributions.

Trail of the Pink Panther (1982) lawsuit
Shortly after the release of Trail of the Pink Panther (1982), Frederick filed suit against MGM, United Artists, and film director Blake Edwards for $3 million in damages and to block the film's distribution. She claimed that the film tarnished Peter Sellers's reputation, and was made without authorization from his estate, which she controlled.

At the High Court in London, the defence argued that the film was meant to be a tribute to Sellers, but Frederick stated “It was an appalling film: Not a tribute to my husband but an insult to his memory.” Her chief objection was that her late husband had specifically prohibited the use of outtakes from earlier Pink Panther films in his lifetime, and that his estate should have had the right to control the use of outtakes after his death. The idea of using outtakes in future Pink Panther films was first presented in Sellers's lifetime when Edwards had shot and edited a three-hour version of The Pink Panther Strikes Again (1976). However, United Artists objected to this long version and the film was trimmed from three hours to an hour and a half.

After Sellers's death in 1980, UA, wanting to cash in on the continuation of the series, elected Edwards to construct a new film from outtakes and deleted scenes from the five previous Pink Panther movies featuring Sellers. A handful of new material involving other actors was specially filmed for inclusion. Some of the older material dated as far back as 1963, nineteen years previously. The lack of continuity was evident in many scenes, and was subjected to heavy mockery from film critics.

In 1985, Judge Charles Hobhouse ruled in favour of Frederick, awarding her $1 million, but dismissed her request to ban the film. Despite her efforts to protect Sellers's legacy, the press continued sneering at her. Frederick herself stated "I hope this proves that I'm not a gold digger! I’ve risked my entire fortune and the financial future of my daughter to protect Peter's reputation." After the lawsuit, Frederick continued to guard Sellers's films and went to great lengths to make sure each one was handled with respect and dignity.

Death
On 27 April 1994, Frederick was found dead by her mother in her West Los Angeles home, aged 39. Foul play and suicide were ruled out and an autopsy failed to determine the cause of death. Some in the media speculated she died from the effects of alcoholism. Her remains were cremated at Golders Green Crematorium in London, and her ashes were interred with those of her first husband, Peter Sellers.

In a 1995 interview with Hello! magazine, her mother, Iris, claimed that Lynne died from natural causes which was brought on by a seizure in her sleep. She also denied accusations that her daughter had a drug or alcohol problem.
"There is absolutely no truth in any of the stories I have read about Lynne's death. I never saw Lynne taking cocaine. She liked a glass of wine, but so do most people and she was no more an alcoholic than the next person. The autopsy report was quite clear, her death was by natural causes. Lynne died of a seizure in her sleep. For the record, the coroner found no evidence that Lynne had been taking drugs."

Legacy
In the years after her death, Frederick's legacy remained poisoned and she was seldom remembered favourably. In the 1995 revision of his 1994 book The Life and Death of Peter Sellers, Roger Lewis claimed that "there is yet to find a single person to say a good thing about Lynne". British journalist Nigel Dempster had a profound dislike for Frederick and referred to her as an "avaricious and cunning man-eater". Other people who have voiced unfavorable views of Lynne include Spike Milligan, Britt Ekland, Sir Roger Moore, Wendy Richard and Simon Williams.

She received minimal attention in the 2004 film adaptation of Lewis's book where she was portrayed by British actress Emilia Fox. All scenes featuring Fox's portrayal of Frederick were deleted from the final cut of the film, but included in the supplemental features of the film's DVD release. On portraying Frederick, Fox stated "I had thought very carefully about playing Lynne. I wanted to represent her in a way that I thought was fair - which was a very young girl being taken up in this world of laughter and light, and then finding out the reality. Peter Sellers was completely obsessed by work and it's very difficult to live with someone like that."

Over time, views towards Frederick's image gradually shifted, and she soon gained a cult following through her films, and has been described as one of the most promising, talented, and beautiful young British actresses of the 1970s. Many credit the negative events in her life (the loss of her acting career, blacklisting in Hollywood, and untimely death) to her marriage to Sellers. Even Roger Lewis, who was blunt about his disdain for Frederick, admitted that "of all of Sellers's wives, Lynne Frederick was the most poorly treated". One of the first people to advocate for Lynne was American author, Ed Sikov, in the 2002 book, Mr. Strangelove: A Biography of Peter Sellers: "Lynne Frederick deserves a bit of compassion herself in retrospect. It was the helpless Peter she nursed, the dependent and infantile creature of impulse and consequent contradiction. Patiently she ministered him". Other people who have defended or come forward with positive recollections of Frederick over the years include Judy Matheson, Françoise Pascal, John Moulder-Brown, Mark Burns, Fabio Testi, Malcolm McDowell, and Graham Crowden.

There has been continued belief that Frederick would have achieved greater career success had it not been for her marriage to Sellers and untimely death. It has been theorized that she had the potential to attain stardom equivalent to that of Helen Mirren, Judi Dench, and Julie Walters.

In 1982, Frederick's screen appearance as Catherine Howard from the film Henry VIII and His Six Wives (1972), was used on the cover art for the 1982 novel The Dark Rose by Cynthia Harrod-Eagles.

For her work in horror films, Frederick has garnered significant popularity as a scream queen. In 2014, her image from the film poster of Schizo (1976) was featured in a montage for the cover of the publication X-CERT 2: The British Independent Horror Film: 1971-1983 by John Hamilton.

The Times obituary for Frederick called her the "Olivia Hussey of her day".

Filmography

Film

Television

‡ denotes lost film

Discography

Soundtrack appearances

¤ denotes that the soundtrack/album never received an official release

Live performances

៛ Performed live 25 December 1973 on the BBC show The Generation Game

Awards and nominations

References

External links

Tribute to Lynne Frederick

1954 births
1994 deaths
English film actresses
English television actresses
People from Hillingdon
People educated at Notting Hill & Ealing High School
Golders Green Crematorium
20th-century English actresses
Spaghetti Western actresses
Actresses from London
Family of Peter Sellers